William G. Fuqua (born November 4, 1930) was a justice of the Kentucky Supreme Court from July 1995 to November 1995.

Born in Russellville, Kentucky, Fuqua's father served as mayor of the town. Fuqua served on the Circuit Court of Logan County, Kentucky, from 1970 until his retirement in June 1995. The following month, he was appointed by Governor Brereton C. Jones  to serve for a brief period as a justice of the Kentucky Supreme Court, to a seat vacated by the retirement of Thomas B. Spain. Fuqua said he would not be a candidate in the special election to fill the remainder of the term.

Beginning in 1997, Fuqua became a frequent guest on the radio show Kentucky Living on WRUS-AM.

References

Justices of the Kentucky Supreme Court
1930 births
Possibly living people
People from Russellville, Kentucky